Bernice Love Wiggins (also Bernice Love Clay, March 4, 1897 – January 27, 1936) was an African American poet writing during the Harlem Renaissance period. Her work was published in the El Paso Herald, the Chicago Defender, the Houston Informer, and other newspapers across Texas.

Biography 
Wiggins was born in Austin, Texas.  Her father, Jessie Austin Love, was also a poet. He had also attended college, and was the Sunday school director for the Holiness Church in Austin. When she was orphaned in 1903, she was raised in El Paso, Texas, by an aunt, Margaret Spiller. Wiggins attended the segregated Douglass school in El Paso, and when she later published her poetry, she dedicated it to one of her teachers, Alice Lydia McGowan, and her former principal, William Coleman, wrote the introduction. In the introduction, Coleman shares that at an early age she had "natural poetic feelings."

Wiggins married Allen D. Wiggins in 1915. Wiggins divorced sometime in the 1920s and moved to Los Angeles. She married Thomas Brackett Clay and lived in Los Angeles, though not much is known about her life in this period. She died on January 27, 1936, and was buried as Bernice Love Clay in the Evergreen Cemetery in Los Angeles.

Work 
Her volume of poetry, Tuneful Tales (1925), contains 102 poems which are written in dialect form. Her poetic tone and style link her to the Harlem Renaissance. Wiggins' poetry focused on her experience of the black community of her time. She also wrote poetry about racial discrimination, lynching and poverty. She "condemned the injustice of laws against prostitution" in her poem, "The Vampire."

References

External links 
 Bernice Love Wiggins on Digie

1897 births
1936 deaths
People from Austin, Texas
People from El Paso, Texas
African-American poets
American women poets
20th-century American women writers
Burials at Evergreen Cemetery, Los Angeles
20th-century African-American women writers
20th-century African-American writers